Amélie Mauresmo defeated Magüi Serna in the final, 4–6, 6–3, 6–4 to win the girls' singles tennis title at the 1996 Wimbledon Championships.

Seeds

  Magdalena Grzybowska (quarterfinals)
  Patty Schnyder (second round)
  Nathalie Dechy (semifinals)
  Sandra Kleinová (second round)
  Anne-Gaëlle Sidot (semifinals)
  Annabel Ellwood (third round)
  Amélie Cocheteux (third round)
  Siobhan Drake-Brockman (second round)
  Jeon Mi-ra (quarterfinals)
  Amélie Mauresmo (champion)
  Olga Barabanschikova (quarterfinals)
  Mirjana Lučić (third round)
  Lilia Osterloh (first round)
  Jitka Schönfeldová (second round)
  Fabiola Zuluaga (first round)
  Zsófia Gubacsi (second round)

Draw

Finals

Top half

Section 1

Section 2

Bottom half

Section 3

Section 4

References

External links

Girls' Singles
Wimbledon Championship by year – Girls' singles